Valerii Serhiiovych Hnatenko (born 3 February 1967) is a Ukrainian politician currently serving as a People's Deputy of Ukraine in the 9th Ukrainian Verkhovna Rada (parliament). Hnatenko is people's deputy for Ukraine's 49th electoral district, representing the city of Druzhkivka. He was previously mayor of Druzhkivka.

Early life and career 
In 1993, he graduated from Yaroslav Mudryi National Law University with a specialisation in law.

Hnatenko worked as criminal intelligence investigator in the Economic Crimes Department of Druzhkivka's Town Department of Ministry of Internal Affairs (Ukraine). From 1996 to 2006, he was head of the Tax Inspection Police in Druzhkivka, Kostiantynivka, and the head of Kramatorsk Tax Inspection Department. In 2010, he became head of Tax Inspection Police of the State Tax Inspection Administration in Zaporizhzhia Oblast.

Political career 
From 26 March 2006 to 29 August 2019, he was mayor of Druzhkivka. During his tenure, Hnatenko achieved notoriety for his early support of the Donetsk People's Republic, and gave a speech in support of the 2014 Donbas status referendums. According to local activists, Hnatenko cooperated with separatist forces and raised the flag of Russia over the city in 2014. When asked about his position on the 2014 pro-Russian unrest in 2018, Hnatenko confronted reporters, accusing them of aggression and shoving a cameraman.

Parliamentary activity 
on 29 August 2019, Valerii Hnatenko took the oath as a People's Deputy of Ukraine, following his election to the Verkhovna Rada as People's Deputy of Ukraine's 49th electoral district, representing Druzhkivka. Hnatenko is a member of the Committee of the Verkhovna Rada on issues of budget, a member of the crossparliamentary group with the United States, and a member of the crossparliamentary group with Italy.

In 2022, following the banning of the Opposition Platform — For Life during the Russian invasion of Ukraine, Hnatenko was one of the founding members of the Restoration of Ukraine party.

Honours and titles 
 Doctorate in the sphere of Business Administration
 He has the title of a colonel of the Tax Inspection Police
 The order of Danylo Khalytskyii 
 The Order of Saint Vladimir
 Diploma of the Verkhovna Rada of Ukraine
 The Order of Ukrainian Cossacks 
 Numerous Certificates of Appriciation of Donetsk Oblast State Administration

References 

1967 births
Living people
People from Druzhkivka
Ninth convocation members of the Verkhovna Rada
Opposition Platform — For Life politicians
Revival (Ukraine) politicians
21st-century Ukrainian politicians